Hacjivah Graham Dayimani (born 23 September 1997) is a South African rugby union player for the  in the United Rugby Championship and the  in the Currie Cup . His regular position is number eight or flanker.

Personal life
Dayimani is Jewish. He is the son of an Igbo Jewish Nigerian father and a Xhosa South African mother. His late father was a devout Jew who observed Shabbat, while his mother is a Sangoma (a traditional African healer). His surname means "diamond" in Zulu while his first name was chosen because it is a combination of the Hebrew name "Akiva" and the Xhosa "Mpumelelo" which means 'achiever'.

References

External links
 itsrugby.co.uk profile

Living people
1997 births
Black Jewish people
Rugby union players from Cape Town
Rugby union flankers
Rugby union number eights
Golden Lions players
South African Jews
South African people of Nigerian descent
South African rugby union players
Xhosa people
Lions (United Rugby Championship) players
Western Province (rugby union) players
Stormers players